Erlton is an inner city residential neighbourhood in the southwest quadrant of Calgary, Alberta. It is bounded by the Elbow River to the north and west, by Spiller Road to the east and by Mission Road to the south. Macleod Trail bisects the neighbourhood from north to south. The neighbourhood is represented by the Erlton Community Association.

Erlton was established in 1906. It is represented in the Calgary City Council by the Ward 8 councillor.

The community is served by the Erlton/Stampede station of the C-Train LRT system. The MNP Community & Sport Centre and Lindsay Park border the community to the north, and the Stampede Grounds are located immediately northwest.

Demographics

Residents in this community had a median household income of $67,698 in 2000, and there were 20.8% low income residents living in the neighbourhood. As of 2000, 14.6% of the residents were immigrants. A proportion of 70.3% of the buildings were condominiums or apartments, and 42% of the housing was used for renting.

See also
List of neighbourhoods in Calgary

References

External links
Erlton Community Association

Neighbourhoods in Calgary